The Blue Cliff Record is a collection of Chan Buddhist kōans originally compiled in Song China in 1125, during the reign of Emperor Huizong, and then expanded into its present form by Chan master Yuanwu Keqin (1063–1135).

The book includes Yuanwu's annotations and commentary on 100 Verses on Old Cases, a compilation of 100 kōans collected by Xuedou Chongxian (980–1052;). Xuedou selected 82 of these from The Jingde Record of the Transmission of the Lamp, with the remainder selected from the Yunmen Guanglu (Extensive Record of Yunmen Wenyan, 864–949).

Name and origin 
The Blue Cliff Record derives its name from the temple where Yuanwu Keqin wrote most of his commentaries, the Blue Cliff Cloister (碧巖院, Bìyán Yuàn) in Hunan. The work was originally called Xuedou's Juko (ju, verse; ko, old koans) before its Blue Cliff Record title was attributed.

Yuanwu first presented it as a series of lectures to his students between 1111 and 1117. It appears these lectures occurred during the traditional 90-day summer retreats, as can be seen from his introduction to the 100th Case, where he writes: "All summer I've been verbosely making up complications... and tripping up all the monks in the land." Written a hundred years before The Gateless Gate, the Blue Cliff Record contains appended verses to each koan, added by Yuanwu to point out their hidden meaning. Yuanwu 's commentaries were added to tempt students trying to understand Zen conceptually and intellectually instead of by their own immediate experience.

The composite work consisting of the one hundred cases, along with poetry added by Xuedou and prose commentary by Yuanwu, is collectively known as the Blue Cliff Record.

Later developments

Yuanwu's successor, Dahui Zonggao (1089–1163), wrote many letters to lay students teaching the practice of concentrating on koans during meditation, but Dahui did not explain and analyze koans. Oral tradition holds that Dahui noticed students engaged in too much intellectual discourse on koans, and then burned the wooden blocks used to print the Blue Cliff Record to "rescue disciples from delusion". 

The text was reconstituted only in the early 14th century by a layman, Zhang Mingyuan. One of Zhang's sons became ill during this time, and others believed that it was an omen meaning that Zhang should not have re-released the book. However, an elder named Feng Zizhen comforted Zhang and encouraged him for his work. Some of Yuanwu's capping phrases and possibly some of Xuedong's capping phrases were lost due to the incomplete source material available to Zhang.

On its republication, the Blue Cliff Record again became one of the most influential works of Zen literature.

Dogen and Japan
Another key legend regards Dōgen (1200–1253), who brought the Caodong school of Chan to Japan as the Sōtō sect of Zen. After an extended visit to China for the purpose of studying Chan, on the night before his planned return to Japan, Dogen came across the Blue Cliff Record for the first time, and stayed up all night making a handwritten copy of the book. Given the size of the book, this story is most likely apocryphal; but Dogen is still credited with introducing the collection to Japan, where it had a wide circulation. The Blue Cliff Record became the central text in Japanese Zen by the Muromachi period of 1336 to 1573.

Literary qualities
The Blue Cliff Record was a subtle and literary text, with wide-ranging philosophical implications, in contrast to the more straightforward nature of  The Gateless Barrier. The Gateless Gate is normally studied before Blue Cliff Record because it is a shorter, simpler text, but all the cases in both texts are independent and could be studied in any sequence.

See also

References

Further reading
 Thomas Cleary and J. C. Cleary, trans. (1998). The Blue Cliff Record; BDK Amerika; 
 Matthew Juksan Sullivan (2021). The Garden of Flowers and Weeds; Monkfish Book Publishing Company, ISBN 1948626497

External links

Another translation of the basic text (cases only)
Chinese original
Original Chinese text with embedded Chinese-English dictionary at NTI Reader
Directory of commentaries on the Blue Cliff Record

Zen koan collections
1125 works
Song dynasty literature
12th-century Chinese books